Satet, Satit or Satjet, Satjit in Ancient Egyptian ( or , ."Pourer" or "Shooter"), Greek: Satis, also known by numerous related names, was an Upper Egyptian goddess who, along with Khnum and Anuket, formed part of the Elephantine Triad. A protective deity of Egypt's southern border with Nubia, she came to personify the former annual flooding of the Nile and to serve as a war, hunting, and fertility goddess.

She was sometimes conflated with Isis and Sopdet, goddess of the bright star Sirius, which the Egyptians connected with the onset of the Nile flooding. Under the interpretatio graeca, she was conflated with Hera and Juno.

Names
The exact pronunciation of Egyptian is often uncertain since vowels were not recorded until a very late period. In transcription, the goddess's name also appears as Setis, Sati, Setet, Satet, Satit, and Sathit.

Her name was originally written with the hieroglyph for a linen garment's shoulder knot (S29); this was later replaced by Anuket's animal hide pierced by an arrow (F29). She was also known by epithets, such as "Mistress of Elephantine" and "She Who Runs Like an Arrow", thought to refer to the flowing river current.

History
A goddess of the Upper Egyptians, her cult is first attested on jars beneath the Step Pyramid of Saqqara (Dynasty III). She appears in the Pyramid Texts (Dynasty VI) purifying a deceased pharaoh's body with four jars of water from Elephantine.

Her principal center of worship was at Abu (Elephantine), an island in Aswan on the southern edge of Egypt. Her temple there occupied an early predynastic site shown by Wells to be aligned with the star Sirius. Other centers include Swenet (Aswan proper) and Setet (Sehel Island nearby). She was particularly associated with the upper reaches of the Nile, which the Egyptians sometimes considered to have its source near Aswan. She is invoked in Aramaic as Sati on a divorce document in the Elephantine papyri.

Myths

As a war goddess, Satis protected Egypt's southern Nubian frontier by killing the enemies of the pharaoh with her sharp arrows.

As a fertility goddess, she was thought to grant the wishes of those who sought love. 

She seems to have originally been paired with the Theban god Montu but later replaced Heket as the consort of Khnum, guardian of the source of the Nile. By Khnum, her child was Anuket, goddess of the Nile. After Khnum was conflated with Ra, she sometimes became an Eye of Ra in place of Hathor.

Together Khnum, Anuket, and Satis formed the Elephantine Triad.

Representation
Satis was usually pictured as a woman in a sheath dress wearing the hedjet, the conical crown of Upper Egypt, with antelope horns. She is sometimes depicted with bow and arrows; holding an ankh or scepter; or offering jars of purifying water.

She also appears in the form of an antelope.

Her symbols were the arrow and the running river.

See also
 Egyptian pantheon
 Elephantine, Aswan, & Sehel Island

Notes

References

Citations

Bibliography
 .
 .

Further reading

External links
 

Egyptian goddesses
Sea and river goddesses
War goddesses
Hunting goddesses
Fertility goddesses
Personifications of rivers
Elephantine